This is a list of avant-garde and experimental films released between 1965 and 1969. Unless otherwise noted, all films had sound and were in color.

References

1960s
Avant-garde